When Bess Got in Wrong is a 1914 Canadian comedy short silent black and white film directed by Al Christie and starring Lee Moran, and Stella Adams. It is written by Bess Meredyth.

Cast
 Bess Meredyth as Bess
 Lee Moran as Lee
 Stella Adams as Stella

References

External links
 

Canadian comedy short films
1914 comedy films
1914 films
1914 short films
Canadian silent short films
Canadian black-and-white films
Films directed by Al Christie
Films with screenplays by Bess Meredyth
Universal Pictures short films
1910s Canadian films
Silent comedy films